Rohan Bopanna and Daniel Nestor were the defending champions, but chose not to compete together. Bopanna played alongside Florin Mergea, but lost in the first round to Nestor and Radek Štěpánek. Nestor and Štěpánek lost in the quarterfinals to Łukasz Kubot and Marcin Matkowski.
Simone Bolelli and Andreas Seppi won the title, defeating Feliciano López and Marc López in the final, 6–2, 3–6, [14–12].

Seeds

Draw

Draw

Qualifying

Seeds

Qualifiers
  Hyeon Chung /  Jiří Veselý

Qualifying draw

References
 Main Draw
 Qualifying Draw

Dubai Tennis Championships - Doubles
Men's Doubles